Xanthopastis is a genus of moths of the family Noctuidae.

Species
 Xanthopastis moctezuma Dyar, 1913
 Xanthopastis regnatrix (Grote, 1863)
 Xanthopastis timais (Cramer, [1780])

References

External links
Natural History Museum Lepidoptera genus database
Xanthopastis at funet

Glottulinae